Lääne-Viru County ( or Lääne-Virumaa) is one of 15 counties of Estonia. It is in northern Estonia, on the south coast of the Gulf of Finland. In Estonian, lääne means western and ida means east or eastern. Lääne-Viru borders Ida-Viru County to the east, Jõgeva County to the south, and Järva and Harju counties to the west. In January 2013, Lääne-Viru County had a population of 58,806: 4.5% of the population in Estonia.

History 
In prehistoric times, Lääne-Virumaa was settled by Estonians of the Vironian tribe.

County Government 
The County Government is led by a governor, who is appointed by the Government of Estonia. Since 2014, the governor position has been held by Marko Torm. The county seat is Rakvere.

Municipalities 
The county is subdivided into municipalities. There is one urban municipality ( – towns) and seven rural municipalities ( – parishes) in Lääne-Viru County.

Religion

Geography

Gallery

References

External links

Lääne-Viru County Government – Official website
Lääne-Virumaa County Infoserver – map and tourism info

 
Counties of Estonia